Thiratoscirtus atakpa is a species of jumping spider in the genus Thiratoscirtus that lives in Nigeria. The female was first identified in 2012.

References

Endemic fauna of Nigeria
Salticidae
Spiders of Africa
Spiders described in 2012